Tail fan can refer to:

Tail fan of a decapod, see decapod anatomy
Tail fan of a bird, see Rump (croup)
Windmill fantail, which turns the cap automatically to bring it into the wind

See also
Fantail (disambiguation)